An industrial safety system is a countermeasure crucial in any hazardous plants such as oil and gas plants and nuclear plants. They are used to protect human, industrial plant, and the environment in case of the process going beyond the allowed control margins.

As the name suggests, these systems are not intended for controlling the process itself but rather protection. Process control is performed by means of process control systems (PCS) and is interlocked by the safety systems so that immediate actions are taken should the process control systems fail.

Process control and safety systems are usually merged under one system, called an integrated control and safety system (ICSS). Industrial safety systems typically use dedicated systems that are SIL 2 certified at minimum; whereas control systems can start with SIL 1. SIL applies to both hardware and software requirements such as cards, processors redundancy and voting functions.

Types
There are 2 main types of industrial safety systems in process industry:
 Process safety system (PSS) or process shutdown system (PSS).
 Safety shutdown system (SSS): This includes emergency shutdown (ESD) and emergency depressurization (EDP) systems.

A third system also exists which acts as a barrier and contains the spray out of hot oil & gases from flanges, valves & pipe joints. These systems are popularly known as safety spray shields and flange guards. The use of spray guards is mandated by OSHA.

Emergency shutdown (ESD) 
These systems may also be redefined in terms of ESD/EDP levels as:
 ESD level 1: In charge of general plant area shutdown, can activate ESD level 2 if necessary. This level can only be activated from main control room in the process industrial plants.
 ESD level 2: This level shuts down and isolates individual ESD zones and activates if necessary EDP.
 ESD level 3: provides "liquid inventory containment".

Safety shutdown system (SSS)
The safety shutdown system (SSS) shall shut down the facilities to a safe state in case of an emergency situation, thus protecting personnel, the environment and the asset. The safety shutdown system shall manage all inputs and outputs relative to emergency shutdown (ESD) functions (environment and personnel protection). This system might also be fed by signals from the main fire and gas system.

Fire and gas system (FGS)
The main objectives of the fire and gas (FGS) system are to protect personnel, environment, and plant (including equipment and structures).
The FGS shall achieve these objectives by:
 Detecting at an early stage, the presence of flammable gas,
 Detecting at an early stage, the liquid spill (LPG and LNG),
 Detecting incipient fire and the presence of fire,
 Providing automatic and/or facilities for manual activation of the fire protection system as required,
 Initiating environmental changes to keep liquids below their flash point
 Initiating signals, both audible and visible as required, to warn of the detected hazards,
 Initiating automatic shutdown of equipment and ventilation if 2 out of 2 or 2 out of 3 detectors are triggered,
 Initiating the exhausting system.

Emergency depressurization (EDP) 
Due to closing emergency shutdown valves in a process, there may be some trapped flammable fluids, and these must be released in order to avoid any undesired consequences (such as pressure increase in vessels and piping). For this, emergency depressurization (EDP) systems are used in conjunction with the ESD systems to release (to a safe location and in a safe manner) such trapped fluids.

Pressure safety valves 
Pressure safety valves (PSVs) are usually used as a final safety solution when all previous systems fail to prevent any further pressure accumulation and protect vessels from rupture due to overpressure by their designed action.

See also
 Safety integrity level

Notes

Telemetry
Industrial automation
Secondary sector of the economy
Safety